Boregowda Bangalorige Banda is a 1970 India Kannada-language film written and directed by B. A. Arasu Kumar, and produced by S. Shivashankarappa, Kalleshappa, Devaramuni Shanmukappa, H. M. Jayanna and S. D. Umapathi under the banner Sri Mallikarjuna Enterprises. It stars Rajesh and Leelavathi; B. Vijayalakshmi and Srinath feature in supporting roles. The title of the film is based on an adage which describes the predicament of a small town man struck by the glamour and glitz of the city.

Cast 
 Rajesh as Boregowda
 Leelavathi as Gowri
 B. Vijayalakshmi as Lakshmi
 Srinath as Raja
 Shakti Prasad as Hulikunte Hanuma

References 

1970 films
1970s Kannada-language films
Indian black-and-white films
Indian drama films
1970 drama films